is a national expressway in Ehime Prefecture. It is owned and operated by the West Nippon Expressway Company (NEXCO West Japan). The route is signed E76 under Ministry of Land, Infrastructure, Transport and Tourism's  "2016 Proposal for Realization of Expressway Numbering."

Junction list
The entire expressway is in Ehime Prefecture. TB - toll gate

See also

References

External links
 West Nippon Expressway Company

Expressways in Japan
Roads in Ehime Prefecture